The Women's giant slalom competition of the Calgary 1988 Olympics was held at Nakiska.

Results

References 

Women's giant slalom
Alp
Oly